The Return of the 5000 Lb. Man is an album by the jazz multi-instrumentalist Rahsaan Roland Kirk.

Reception
The AllMusic review by Thom Jurek states: "Kirk is at full creative and musical strength. These seven tracks are an utter astonishment. Kirk's playing of saxophones, harmonica, flutes, and euphonium is deep, soulful, and even profound in places... This is one that's utterly necessary for fans, and a very fitting intro for the novice".

Track listing
 "Theme for the Eulipions" (Rahsaan Roland Kirk, Betty Neals) - 9:30
 "Sweet Georgia Brown" (Ben Bernie, Kenneth Casey, Maceo Pinkard) - 4:47
 "I'll Be Seeing You" (Sammy Fain, Irving Kahal) - 6:09
 "Loving You" (Minnie Riperton, Richard Rudolph) - 4:49
 "Goodbye Pork Pie Hat" (Charles Mingus, Kirk) - 6:22
 "There Will Never Be Another You" (Mack Gordon, Harry Warren) - 5:09
 "Giant Steps" (John Coltrane) - 6:12
Recorded at Regent Sound Studios, NYC, 1975

Personnel
 Roland Kirk: tenor saxophone, manzello, stritch, clarinet, flute, harmonica, euphonium
 Howard Johnson: tuba (tracks 1, 6 and 7)
Romeo Penque: baritone saxophone, oboe (tracks 1, 6 and 7)
 Hilton Ruiz: piano, celesta (tracks 1 and 4-7)
 Buster Williams: bass (tracks 1, 6 and 7)
 Charlie Persip: drums (tracks 1, 6 and 7)
 Joe Habao Texidor: percussion, vocals (tracks 1 and 4-7)
 Betty Neals: recitation (track 1)
 Maeretha Stewart: vocals (track 1)
 Hank Jones: piano (track 2)
 Milt Hinton: bass (track 2)
 Fred Moore: washboard (track 2)
 Wilton Eaton: whistling (track 2)
 Trudy Pitts: organ (track 3)
 William Butler: guitar (tracks 3-5)
 Bill Carney: drums (tracks 3-5)
 Arthur Jenkins: keyboards (tracks 4 and 5)
 Matathias Pearson: bass (tracks 4 and 5)
 Jerry Griffin: drums (tracks 4 and 5)
 Warren Smith: percussion (tracks 4 and 5)
 Unknown chorus (tracks 6 and 7)

References

1976 albums
Warner Records albums
Rahsaan Roland Kirk albums
Albums produced by Joel Dorn